Drammen District Court is a district court located in Drammen, Norway.  It covers the municipalities of Drammen,  Hurum, Lier, Røyken, Sande and Svelvik and is subordinate Borgarting Court of Appeal.

References

External links 
Official site 

Defunct district courts of Norway
Organisations based in Drammen